Henry Horenstein (born 1947) is an American artist, photographer, filmmaker and educator. He is the author of over 35 books, including a series of instructional textbooks.

Life and work
He studied history at the University of Chicago and earned his BFA and MFA at Rhode Island School of Design (RISD), where he is now professor of photography. He has worked as a professional photographer, filmmaker, teacher, and author since the early 1970s.

Honky Tonk: Portraits of Country Music (2003) is a documentary survey of country music during the late 1970s and early 1980s. Honky Tonk has also been presented as an exhibition at many public and private museums and galleries, notably the Smithsonian's National Museum of American History in 2006, the Rhode Island School of Design Museum in 2005, and The Annenberg Space for Photography in 2014.

In recent years, Horenstein has been working on short documentary films. His films include Murray (2010), with William A. Anderson and Hillary Spera; Spoke (2014), a celebration of the Austin, Texas, dance hall, the Broken Spoke, which was funded by The Annenberg Space for Photography and screened at the Austin Film Festival; Partners (2018), which premiered in May 2018 at Boston's Museum of Fine Arts; and Blitto Underground (2021), about bohemian Buenos Aires, which premiered at the International Film Festival in Buenos Aires, the Paris Independent Film Festival, and the Berlin International Art Film Festival. He is currently at work on Marksville, LA, a film about Cajun Louisiana.

Speedway 1972, his photographs shot at the Thompson Speedway 50 years ago, was published by Stanley/Barker (UK) in 2022.

"We Sort of People", in collaboration with writer Leslie Tucker, will be published by Kehrer Verlag (Germany) in 2023. 

Horenstein lives in Boston.

Publications 

Black and White Photography: A Basic Manual, Little, Brown, 1974, 1983, 2005
Beyond Basic Photography: A Technical Manual, Little, Brown, 1977
The Photographer's Source: A Complete Catalog, Simon & Schuster, 1989
Baseball Days: From the Sandlots To The Show, text by Bill Littlefield, Bulfinch/Little, Brown, 1993
Color Photography: A Working Manual, Little, Brown, 1995
Racing Days, text by Brendan Boyd, Viking, 1987; (paperback edition) Owl/Henry Holt, 1995; Pond, 1999
Branson, MO: Las Vegas of the Ozarks, Artisan/Workman, 1998
Creatures, Pond/Consortium, 1999; (paperback edition) Stewart, Tabori, Chang, 2000
Canine, Pond/Consortium, 2000
Digital Photography: A Basic Manual, Little Brown, 2001Photography, co-author Russell Hart, Prentice-Hall/Pearson, 2001, 2004Aquatics, Stewart, Tabori, Chang, 2001Honky Tonk: Portraits of Country Music, Chronicle, 2003
Revised edition. WW Norton, 2012.Humans, Kehrer, 2004Close Relations, powerhouse, 2007Animalia, Pond, 2008SHOW, Pond, 2010Digital Photography: A Basic Manual, Little, Brown, 2011Histories, Honky Tonk, 2016Shoot What You Love, Monacelli, 2016Make Better Pictures, Little, Brown, 2018Henry Horenstein: Selected Works, List Gallery, Swarthmore College, 2019Speedway72, Stanley/Barker, 2022. .
 "We Sort of People", Kehrer Verlag, 2023

 Films 
 Preacher (1998)
 Murray (2007) – with William A. Anderson and Hillary Spera
 Spoke (2014)
 Partners (2018)
 Blitto Underground (2021)
 Marksville, LA (in progress)

 Film Credits 
 Imagraphy (2019)
 Country: Portraits of an American Sound (2015)
 The Photographers Series: Henry Horenstein'' (2014)

Collections
Horenstein's work is held in the following permanent collections:
J. Paul Getty Museum
Museum of Fine Arts, Houston
San Antonio Museum of Art
Duke University's David M. Rubenstein Rare Book & Manuscript Library – holds a significant collection of Horenstein's work
Smithsonian Museum of American History – holds a significant collection of Horenstein's work

References

General references

External links 
 
 Guide to the Henry Horenstein photographs, David M. Rubenstein Rare Book & Manuscript Library, Duke University

American photographers
1947 births
Living people
Artists from Boston
Rhode Island School of Design alumni
Rhode Island School of Design faculty